Classical demography refers to the study of human demography in the Classical period. It often focuses on the absolute number of people who were alive in civilizations around the Mediterranean Sea between the Bronze Age and the fall of the Western Roman Empire, but in recent decades historians have been more interested in trying to analyse demographic processes such as the birth and death rates or the sex ratio of ancient populations. The period was characterized by an explosion in population with the rise of the Greek and Roman civilizations followed by a steep decline caused by economic and social disruption, migrations, and a return to primarily subsistence agriculture. Demographic questions play an important role in determining the size and structure of the economy of Ancient Greece and the Roman economy.

Ancient Greece and Greek colonies
From around 800 BC, Greek city-states began colonizing the Mediterranean and Black Sea coasts. Suggested reasons for this dramatic expansion include overpopulation, severe droughts, or an escape for vanquished people (or a combination). The population of the areas of Greek settlement from the western Mediterranean to Asia Minor and the Black Sea in the 4th century BC has been estimated at up to 7.5-10 million.

Greece proper
The geographical definition of Greece has fluctuated over time. While today the ancient kingdom of Macedonia is always considered part of the Greek world, in the Classical period it was a distinct entity and even though Macedonian language was part of the Greek dialect continuum, it was not considered as a part of Greece by some Athenian writers. Similarly, almost all modern residents of historical Ionia, now part of Turkey, speak the Turkish language, although from the 1st millennium BC Ionia was densely populated by Greek-speaking people and an important part of Greek culture.

Estimates of the Greek-speaking population in the coast and islands of the Aegean Sea during the 5th century BC vary from 800,000 to over 3,000,000. In Athens and Attica in the 5th century BC, there were up to 150,000 Athenians of the citizen class, around 30,000 aliens, and 100,000 slaves, most residing outside the city and port., though precise numbers remain unknown and estimates vary widely.

Other Greek colonization

The ancient Roman province of Cyrenaica in the eastern region of present-day Libya was home to a Greek, Latin and native population in the hundreds of thousands. Originally settled by Greek colonists, five important settlements (Cyrene, Barca, Euesperides, Apollonia, and Tauchira) formed a pentapolis. The fertility of the land, the exportation of silphium, and its location between Carthage and Alexandria made it a magnet for settlement.

Ancient Phoenicia and Phoenician colonies

Phoenicia also established colonies along the Mediterranean, including Carthage.

Demography of the Hellenistic kingdoms

When urbanization began to take place, it was Pella which became the largest city. Kingdom of Macedonia had 4 million people after the Wars of the Diadochi.

Ptolemaic Egypt
Greek historian Diodorus Siculus estimated that 7,000,000 inhabitants resided in Egypt during his lifetime before its annexation by the Roman Empire. Of this, he states that 300,000 citizens lived within the city of Alexandria. Later historians have queried whether the country could have supported such high numbers.

Seleucid Empire
The population of the vast Seleucid Empire has been estimated to have been higher than 30 million., though others indicate as few as 20 million inhabitants in the whole of Alexander's earlier empire of which it had been a part.

Demography of the Roman Empire

There are many estimates of the population for the Roman Empire, that range from 45 million to 120 million with 59–76 million as the most accepted range.  The population likely peaked just before the Antonine Plague. 

An estimated population of the empire during the reign of Augustus:

Beloch's 1886 estimate for the population of the empire during the reign of Augustus:

Russell's 1958 estimate for the population of the empire in 1 AD:

Russell's 1958 estimate for the population of the empire in 350 AD:

Roman Italy
The Romans carried out a regular census of citizens eligible for military service (Polybius 2.23), but for the population of the rest of Italy at this time we have to rely on a single report of the military strength of Rome's allies in 227 BC – and guess the numbers of those who were opposed to Rome at this time. The citizen count in the second century B.C. hovered between 250–325,000 presumably males over the age of 13.

The census of 70/69 B.C. records 910,000 presumably due to the extension of citizenship to the allies after the Social War of 91–88. Still, even if only males this seems like an undercount. For the 1st and 2nd centuries BC, historians have developed two radically different accounts, resting on different interpretations of the figures of 4,036,000 recorded for the census carried out by Augustus in 28 BC, 4,233,000 in 8 BC, and 4,937,000 in 14 AD. and almost 6 million during the reign of Claudius, not all of whom lived in Italy. Many lived in Spain, Gaul and other parts of the Empire.  If this only represents adult male citizens (or some subset of adult male citizens those over age 13 as the census traditionally did not count children until they were formally enrolled as citizens early in puberty), then the population of Italy must have been around 10 million, not including slaves and foreigners, which was a striking, sustained increase despite the Romans' losses in the almost constant wars over the previous two centuries. Others find this entirely incredible, and argue that the census must now be counting all citizens, male and female over the age of 13 – in which case the population had declined slightly, something which can readily be attributed to war casualties and to the crisis of the Italian peasantry. The majority of historians favour the latter interpretation as being more demographically plausible, but the issue remains contentious.

Estimates for the population of mainland Italia, including Gallia Cisalpina, at the beginning of the 1st Century AD range from 6,000,000 according to Beloch in 1886, 6,830,000 according to Russell in 1958, less than 10,000,000 according to Hin in 2007, and 14,000,000 according to Lo Cascio in 2009.

Evidence for the population of Rome itself or of the other cities of Roman Italy is equally scarce. For the capital, estimates have been based on the number of houses listed in 4th-century AD guidebooks, on the size of the built-up area, and on the volume of the water supply, all of which are problematic; the best guess is based on the number of recipients of the grain dole under Augustus, 200,000, implying a population of around 800,000–1,200,000. Italy had numerous urban centres – over 400 are listed by Pliny the Elder – but the majority were small, with populations of just a few thousand. As much as 40% of the population might have lived in towns (25% if the city of Rome is excluded), on the face of it an astonishingly high level of urbanisation for a pre-industrial society. However, studies of later periods would not count the smallest centres as 'urban'; if only cities of 10,000+ are counted, Italy's level of urbanisation was a more realistic (but still impressive) 25% (11% excluding Rome).

See also
Historical demography
Medieval demography
Colonies in antiquity
Roman agriculture
Deforestation during the Roman period
List of states by population in 1 CE
Pre-modern human migration

References

Bibliography

Further reading 
Ancient Greece

 (Review )

Roman Republic and Empire

External links 
Princeton/Stanford Working Papers in Classics: Walter Scheidel on Roman demography and population history

Demographic history
Classical studies